BOM (3,4,5,beta-tetramethoxyphenethylamine) is a lesser-known psychedelic drug.  It is the beta-methoxy derivative of mescaline. BOM was first synthesized by Alexander Shulgin. In his book PiHKAL, the minimum dosage is listed as 200 mg, and the duration unknown. BOM produces few to no effects. Very little data exists about its pharmacological properties, metabolism, and toxicity.

Legality

United Kingdom
This substance is a Class A drug in the Drugs controlled by the UK Misuse of Drugs Act.

See also 
 Phenethylamine
 Psychedelics, dissociatives and deliriants

References

Psychedelic phenethylamines
Phenylethanolamine ethers